APRS may refer to:

 Association of Professional Recording Services
 Automatic Packet Reporting System, amateur radio instant messaging and telemetry protocol
 Annual percentage rates (APRs)